Michael Weiss (born May 23, 1991) is an American competition swimmer who has represented the United States in international championships including the FINA World Championships, Pan American Games, and World University Games.

Career
Weiss was born in Reno, Nevada, where he was a three-time Nevada Interscholastic Activities Association state champion while in high school, winning one championship event in each of his sophomore, junior and senior years.

Weiss won the gold medal at the short course 2012 FINA World Swimming Championships (25 m) in the 4x200-meter freestyle relay, having swum the anchor leg in the preliminary heats, which teammate Matt McLean swam in the final.

Weiss swam at the 2013 version of the made-for-television Duel in the Pool.  He was also a gold medalist at the 2013 Summer Universiade.

He again won gold at the short course 2014 FINA World Swimming Championships (25 m) in the 4x200-meter relay, having swum the third leg in the preliminary heats, which teammate Matt McLean (as in 2012) swam in the final. He also competed at the 2014 Pan Pacific Swimming Championships.

References

1991 births
Living people
Sportspeople from Reno, Nevada
Wisconsin Badgers men's swimmers
American male freestyle swimmers
Medalists at the FINA World Swimming Championships (25 m)
Swimmers at the 2015 Pan American Games
World Aquatics Championships medalists in swimming
Pan American Games silver medalists for the United States
Pan American Games medalists in swimming
Universiade medalists in swimming
Universiade gold medalists for the United States
Universiade silver medalists for the United States
Medalists at the 2013 Summer Universiade
Medalists at the 2015 Pan American Games